Begum Khursheed Shahid (1 January 1926 – 27 June 2021) was a Pakistani actress and singer. She was also the mother of actor Salman Shahid.

Early life
Khursheed Shahid was born in 1926 in Delhi, where her father was a government official and her mother was an educated housewife. Khursheed along with her sisters and brother used to watch performances of Ram Leela a religious theatre. She along with her sisters used to act in Ram Leela Theatre portraying different characters on stage at age seven. Khursheed completed her education from Delhi. Khursheed father was a liberal man and he believed that education was important for girls. Khursheed sibling included four sisters and one brother. Khursheed's father supported her career.

Career
Khursheed Shahid began acting and singing at the age of nine. When Khursheed was in grade six a Congress leader Aruna Asaf Ali came to her school looking for someone young and her classmates told Ms. Ali about her singing and acting talents. Ms. Ali selected Kurhseed for a musical performance. Later after the performance Ms. Ali took her to the All India Radio to renowned music composer Feroz Nizami, he listened her singing and encouraged her to sing. He gave her a poem to sing after listening to Khursheed so he told her to visit him the next day so that he will composed it for her. The following day when she sang the poem for Feroz, he liked it and told her that it was of Raag Darbari. Khursheed was nine when she started singing at All India Radio, Delhi. She also read poems wrote by Mukhtar Siddiqui at All India Radio.

Later she moved to Parliament Street there she meet music director Roshan Lal Nagrath paternal grandfather to popular Indian actor Hrithik Roshan. He saw Khursheed's potential for singing and he started to have rehearsing for her and gave her lessons about singing. Kursheed befriend his wife and she would visit his family.

After the Partition in 1947, she along with her family moved to Lahore in Pakistan. Khursheed went to Radio Pakistan for audition and she start doing musical programmes by station director Mehmood Nizami. He liked her classical singing and gave her lessons. Mehmood Nizami introduced Khursheed to Bhai Lal and she learned classical singing from Bhai Lal Mohammad. She was also inspired by Roshan Ara Begum, she started copying her style and singing that many people acknowledged that Khursheed sounded like Roshan Ara on the radio. Khursheed met Roshan Ara Begum at Lahore Arts Council. There Khursheed and Roshan Ara Begum became friends and she would take Khursheed to places she would visit and then she taught Khursheed to play Tanpura.

Khursheed used do theatre before the launch of PTV in 1964 and she did a lot of quality theatre plays written by Faiz Ahmad Faiz, Manto and Sadequain. Khursheed made a name for herself in theatre. After PTV was launched in 1964 in Pakistan the executive Aslam Azhar of PTV offered her work. She agreed on a condition that she would be the highest paid actress and he accepted her condition. Khursheed did her first play for PTV was Ras Malai a comedy drama. Then she regularly worked for PTV in dramas Wadi-e-Purkhar, Kaanch Ka Pul, Fehmida Ki Kahani, Ustani Rahat Ki Zabani, Kiran Kahani and Dhund.

Then Khursheed appeared in Khurshid Anwar's film Chingari on the insistence of Faiz Sahib.  Khursheed performance in Punjabi movie Bhola Sajan directed by Ashfaque Malik was regarded as a finest acting even Khursheed admitted herself.

In 1995 Khursheed was honoured for her contributions towards the singing, film and television industry, she was honored by the Government of Pakistan with the Pride of Performance.

Khursheed worked in popular TV dramas series to her credit, including Parchaiyan, Zair, Zabar, Pesh and Uncle Urfi all these dramas series were written by playwright and scriptwriter Haseena Moin. Later in late 2003 she retired and went to live with her son, she moved to Lahore permanently to be with her son Salman Shahid.

Personal life
Kursheed married producer Salim Shahid at a very young age the marriage did not last long, they did not divorced. Salim left for BBC London a few years after their marriage there he stayed till his death. She has one son Salman Shahid who is also an actor.

Illness and death
Khursheed Shahid was admitted to a hospital a few days back after she suffered a cardiac arrest. She died on 27 June due to cardiac arrest while she was in hospital, age 95. She was laid to rest in a Phase 7 cemetery after her funeral prayers were held at Defense mosque in Defense Phase 2, Block T.

Filmography

Television series
 Ras Malai
 Uncle Urfi
 Zair, Zabar, Pesh
 Parchaiyan
 Masoom
 Samundar 
 Sayeen Aur Psychiatrist
 Saahil
 Man Chalay Ka Sauda
 Inn Sey Miliye
 Chabi Aur Chabiyan
 Dhoop Dewar
 Kaanch Ka Pul
 Fehmida Ki Kahani, Ustani Rahat Ki Zubani
 Andhera Ujala
 Sannata
 Sona Chandi 
 Chabi Aur Chabiyan
 Ana
 Dhund
 Kiran Kahani
 Fishaar
 Wadi-e-Purkhar
 Boota from Toba Tek Singh

Telefilm
 Haq dar

Film
 Dhoop Aur Saye
 Chingari
 Bhola Sajan
 Khamosh Pani
 Ghalib

Awards and recognition
She was awarded the Pride of Performance by the President of Pakistan in 1995

References

External links
 

1926 births
Urdu-language singers
20th-century Indian women singers
Actresses in Urdu cinema
2021 deaths
20th-century Indian singers
Pakistani film actresses
20th-century Pakistani women singers
Punjabi-language singers
20th-century Pakistani actresses
Hindi-language singers
Pakistani television actresses
Actresses from Punjab, Pakistan
Actresses in Punjabi cinema
Recipients of the Pride of Performance
Pakistani women singers
21st-century Pakistani actresses
Actresses in Hindi cinema
Singers from Lahore
21st-century Indian women singers
21st-century Indian singers
People from British India
21st-century Pakistani women singers
Radio personalities from Lahore
Pakistani radio personalities